Plot (released in the US as The French Conspiracy) is a 1972 French-Italian political thriller film directed by Yves Boisset, inspired by the assassination of Mehdi Ben Barka in Paris. It was entered into the 8th Moscow International Film Festival where it won the Silver Prize.

Plot
The African opposition politician Sadiel lives in exile in Geneva. To take him out for good, the dictator Kassar pacts with the CIA and the French secret service. Finally, the French journalist Darien is blackmailed to ask Sadiel from his exile in Switzerland for an interview in Paris. The reporter, who understands the game after a while, cannot prevent the assassination of the politician in the end. Afterwards, an American friend of the politician kills another confidant on behalf of the CIA.

Cast
Jean-Louis Trintignant as François Darien - an unstable intellectual
Michel Piccoli as Kassar The Colonel - the interior minister of a North African country
Jean Seberg as Edith Lemoine - a leftist nurse
Gian Maria Volonté as Sadiel - a leading Maghreb progressive
Michel Bouquet as Maïtre Lempereur - a corrupt lawyer
Bruno Cremer as Master Michel Vigneau - lawyer Sadiel
Daniel Ivernel as Antoine Acconetti - a mobster
Karin Schubert as Sabine
Philippe Noiret as Pierre Garcin - the information officer at the ORTF
Francois Perier as Commissioner Rene Rouannat - an honest cop
Roy Scheider as Michael Howard - a correspondent for American TV
Jacques François as Lestienne - the head of the French secret services
Jean Bouise as a high-ranking French officer who covers the case

References

External links
 

1972 films
1970s spy thriller films
Films about journalists
Films scored by Ennio Morricone
Films directed by Yves Boisset
1970s French-language films
French spy thriller films
Italian thriller films
1970s political thriller films
Films à clef
1970s French films
1970s Italian films